Sir Lancelot Sanderson  (24 October 1863 – 9 March 1944) was a British Conservative politician and judge.

A barrister of the Inner Temple, he was appointed Recorder of Wigan in 1901 and took silk in 1903.
He was elected as Member of Parliament (MP) for the Appleby division of Westmorland at the January 1910 general election, regaining a formerly Conservative seat which had been held by Liberal MPs since 1900. He was re-elected in the general election of December 1910, but resigned his seat and recordership in October 1915, when he was appointed Chief Justice of the High Court of Judicature in Calcutta after Hon'ble Justice Lawrence Hugh Jenkins. Upon his resignation from that position in 1926, Sanderson was appointed to the Privy Council and sat on the Judicial Committee of the Privy Council from 1934 until 1935. He died in Lancaster aged 80.

Sanderson was also a cricketer. He played two first-class matches; the first for Lancashire in 1884, and the second for the Marylebone Cricket Club four years later.

References

External links 
 
 

1863 births
1944 deaths
Conservative Party (UK) MPs for English constituencies
Knights Bachelor
Members of the Inner Temple
Members of the Privy Council of the United Kingdom
Members of the Judicial Committee of the Privy Council
Chief Justices of the Calcutta High Court
UK MPs 1910
UK MPs 1910–1918
Vice Chancellors of the University of Calcutta
English cricketers
Lancashire cricketers
Marylebone Cricket Club cricketers